The 2015–16 American Eagles men's basketball team represented American University during the 2015–16 NCAA Division I men's basketball season. The Eagles, led by third year head coach Mike Brennan, played their home games at Bender Arena and were members of the Patriot League. They finished the season 12–19, 9–9 in Patriot League play to finish in a four way tie for fourth place. They defeated Boston University in the quarterfinals of the Patriot League tournament to advance the semifinals where they lost to Lehigh.

Previous season 
The Eagles finished the season 17–16, 8–10 in Patriot League play to finish in a three way tie for sixth place. They advanced to the championship game of the Patriot League tournament where they lost to Lafayette.

Departures

Incoming recruits

Roster

Schedule

|-
!colspan=9 style="background:#0000FF; color:#CC0000;"| Non-conference regular season

|-
!colspan=9 style="background:#0000FF; color:#CC0000;"| Patriot League regular season

|-
!colspan=9 style="background:#0000FF; color:#CC0000;"| Patriot League tournament

See also
2015–16 American Eagles women's basketball team

References

American Eagles men's basketball seasons
American
American Eagles men's basketball
American Eagles men's basketball